Helicobasidium is a genus of fungus in the family Helicobasidiaceae.

Species
Helicobasidium albicans
Helicobasidium anomalum
Helicobasidium arboreum
Helicobasidium candidum
Helicobasidium cirratum
Helicobasidium cirrhatum
Helicobasidium compactum
Helicobasidium corticioides
Helicobasidium filicinum
Helicobasidium hemispira
Helicobasidium holospirum
Helicobasidium hypochnoides
Helicobasidium inconspicuum
Helicobasidium incrustans
Helicobasidium killermannii
Helicobasidium longisporum
Helicobasidium peckii
Helicobasidium purpureum
Helicobasidium smilacinum
Helicobasidium tanakae

References

Basidiomycota genera
Helicobasidiales
Taxa named by Narcisse Théophile Patouillard
Taxa described in 1885